is a railway station in Hyūga, Miyazaki, Japan.

Lines

Layout 
The station consists of a side and an island platform serving three tracks at grade with a siding branching off track 1. There is no station building, only a simple shed has been provided on platform 1 as a waiting room for passengers. Access to the island platform is by means of a footbridge. Parking and a bike shed are available at the station forecourt.

Adjacent stations

History
In 1913, the  had opened a line from  northwards to Hirose (now closed). After the Miyazaki Prefectural Railway was nationalized on 21 September 1917, Japanese Government Railways (JGR) undertook the subsequent extension of the track as part of the then Miyazaki Main Line, reaching  by 11 September 1920. In the next phase of expansion, the track was extended to Mimitsu, which opened as the new northern terminus on 11 June 1921. It became a through station on 11 October 1921 when the track was further extended to Tomitaka (now ). Expanding north in phases and joining up with other networks, the track eventually reached  and the entire stretch from Kokura through Mimitsu to Miyakonojō was redesignated as the Nippō Main Line on 15 December 1923. With the privatization of Japanese National Railways (JNR), the successor of JGR, on 1 April 1987, the station came under the control of JR Kyushu.

Passenger statistics
In fiscal 2016, the station was used by an average of 123 passengers (boarding only) per day.

See also
List of railway stations in Japan

References

External links
Mimitsu (JR Kyushu)

Railway stations in Miyazaki Prefecture
Railway stations in Japan opened in 1921